Yenidoğanlar is a village administered by Alaplı District of Zonguldak Province in Turkey. The mukhtar is currently Mehmet Akyol. The village's name means "newborns" because it was a new village made of two other villages.

Geography
The village is made from three neighborhoods, Büyükilyaslı and Küçükilyaslı Neighborhoods which used to be in Alaplıkocaali Village and Kızıllar Neighborhood, which came from Musabeyli Village and is the center neighborhood of the village.

Population

Climate
The climate is in the Köppen Climate Classification of Cfb.

Economy
The economy in the village is mostly based on agriculture, specifically hazelnut agriculture and animal farming. The only store in the village constitutes the trade, although the residents also go to neighboring Kurtlar Village (Kaptaş) and sometimes Karadeniz Ereğli for shopping too.

Infrastructure
The village used to have a primary school with only 10 students, but after the migration of 4 pupils to the city it was closed. There are water pipelines but not sewage pipelines. There are no post offices or health organizations. The road that transports people to the village is asphalt. The village has electricity and cable phone.

References

External links

Villages in Alaplı District